The Blind Owl (1936; , Boof-e koor) is Sadegh Hedayat's magnum opus and a major literary work of 20th century Iran. Written in Persian, it is narrated by an unnamed pen case painter, who addresses his murderous confessions to a shadow on his wall that resembles an owl. His confessions do not follow a linear progression of events and often repeat and layer themselves thematically, thus lending to the open-ended nature of interpretation of the story.

Background

The Blind Owl was written during the oppressive latter years of the rule of Reza Shah. It is believed that much of the novel had already been completed by 1930 while Hedayat was still a student in Paris. Hedayat was inspired by European literature and ideas, and challenged many traditional Iran conventions in the novel, a quality that has often marked him as the father of modernist Persian literature. It was originally published in a limited edition in Bombay, during Hedayat's two-year-long stay there in 1937, and stamped with "Not for sale or publication in Iran." The novel was not tolerated during Reza Shah's rule, probably due to its "pessimism which went counter to the Shah’s grandiloquent rhetoric of progress." After Reza Shah's abdication, it was serialised in the daily Iran, and had an immediate and forceful effect. It was later banned, reportedly because it led readers towards suicide.

Plot

The novel tells the story of an unnamed pen case painter, who, while in despair after losing a mysterious lover, addresses his morbid confessions to a shadow on his wall that looks like an owl. He sees in his macabre, feverish nightmares that "the presence of death annihilates all that is imaginary". Death hangs over the narrator, who claims that "[w]e are the offspring of death and death delivers us from the tantalizing, fraudulent attractions of life" and that, "[t]hroughout our lives, the finger of death points at us." The novel is in two parts. The first is a surrealist, dreamlike narrative of the opium-addicted narrator, the woman he both loves and loathes, and a cackling, turban-wearing old man. The second part retells that story in a more realistic tone, and includes details that appear to contradict the first part.

Translations
The Blind Owl was first translated into French by Roger Lescot during World War II, apparently with Hedayat's knowledge and approval, and published as La Chouette Aveugle (1953), and later by Pasteur Vallery Radot, a member of the French Academy. The book was well received in the French literary circles. The Blind Owl was translated into English by D. P. Costello (1957), by Iraj Bashiri (1974, revised in 1984 and again in 2013), by Naveed Noori (2011) and by Sassan Tabatabai (2022). It has subsequently been translated into many other languages.

Film
The novel was made into a film in 1974, directed by Kioumars Derambakhsh, starring Parviz Fanizadeh, Farshid Farshood and Parvin Solaymani.

It was also very loosely adapted into the 1987 film The Blind Owl directed by Raúl Ruiz.

It was adapted into a 2018 feature film, The Blind Owl: Boofe Koor by Iranian-Canadian Mazdak Taebi.

References

External links
Online Persian text
Hedayat's original handwriting of The Blind Owl
Iraj Bashiri's translation
Symbolism of women in Hedayat's "Blind Owl", by Massoume Price, Iran Chamber.
This Book Will End Your Life: The Greatest Modern Persian Novel Ever Written by Porochista Khakpour
The Blind Owl in Internet Speculative Fiction Database

1937 novels
Books by Sadegh Hedayat
Iranian speculative fiction novels
Persian literature
Persian-language novels
Works about philosophical pessimism